Jacqueline Mitelman is an Australian portrait photographer.

Early life and education 
Jacqueline Mitelman was born Jacqueline MacGreggor in Scotland in 1948, and has since lived in Melbourne and in France for a few years. She was briefly married to Polish emigrant the painter/printmaker Allan Mitelman. She studied for a Diploma of Art and Design at Prahran College of Advanced Education 1973-76, where her lecturers were Athol Shmith, Paul Cox, and John Cato.

Career 
After graduation, Mitelman practiced as a freelance photographer specialising in portraiture for magazines and newspapers, album and book covers, and for theatre and music posters. During her career she has sought out Australia's significant writers, artists and personalities for her subjects, thus creating a valuable pantheon of the country's culture.

The National Portrait Gallery holds twenty of her photographs including those of Dorothy Hewett, Helen Garner, Judith Wright, Jack Hibberd, Peter Carey, Michael Leunig, Christina Stead, Brett Whiteley, Germaine Greer, Ruby Hunter, Murray Bail, Alan Marshall, Kylie Tennant, Susan Ryan, Ita Buttrose and Max Dupain. Her depiction of Miss Alesandra won the Gallery’s National Photographic Portrait prize, for which she received $25,000 provided by Visa International. Mitelman says of her approach that;

Of Mitelman’s portraits of dogs, critic Anna Clabburn wrote;

Exhibitions 
 2019/20, 21 September-20 January: A Dog’s Life, curators Maudie Palmer AO and Eugene Howard, Hamilton Gallery
2016: Finalist, Bowness Prize, Monash Gallery of Art
 2014: Finalist, Pinnacles Gallery Portrait Prize
 2013, May: On Cockatoo Island, Mars Gallery
 2012: Smith Street Portrait Project, Gertrude Street Projection Festival
 2011/12, October–February: Tarra Warra Museum of Art
 2010: Finalist, National Photographic Portrait Prize, National Portrait Gallery
 2008: Finalist, Olive Cotton Award, Tweed River Art Gallery
 2007: Finalist, Olive Cotton Award, Tweed River Art Gallery
 2008, April: Some Dogs, MARS Gallery Port Melbourne
 2005, April: Mostly Strange, MARS Gallery Port Melbourne 
 2002, January 3-February 10: Investigations, Herring Island Environmental Sculpture Park
 2002, October 8–25: Photomontage, J-Space Centre for Contemporary Art, Chisholm Institute
 1998/9, November–January: Dog Portraiture,  Monash Gallery of Art
 1995, March 8-June 8: Beyond the Picket Fence: Australian women's art in the National Library collections, National Library of Australia, Canberra, opened by Andrea Stretton, 7 March 1995
 1989, July 20–August 27: Jacqueline Mitelman, Jeff Busby, Greg Elms, Peter Leiss, Resurgence, The Photographers' Gallery
 1975, October 1-September 6: Wimmin: six wimmin photographers, National Gallery of Victoria, for International Women's Year
 1975: Woman 1975, touring exhibition of the Women's Christian Association of Australia, Victoria, for International Women's Year

Awards 
 2011: National Photographic Portrait Prize National Portrait Gallery
 2004: Josephine Ulrick National Photography Prize

Collections 
 National Portrait Gallery
 National Library of Australia
 Australia Defence Force Academy Library
 National Gallery of Victoria
Art Gallery of New South Wales
 State Library of Victoria
 Museum of Modern Art at Heide
 Monash Gallery of Art
 Tweed River Art Gallery

Publications

References 

1949 births
Living people
Australian women photographers
Australian portrait photographers
Scottish emigrants to Australia
21st-century Australian photographers
20th-century Australian photographers
20th-century women photographers
21st-century women photographers
20th-century Australian women